Thoralf Johannes Irgens Evje  (8 December 1902 – 4 September 1976) was a Norwegian judge, civil servant and politician for the Labour Party. 

He was born in Vestre Aker to priest Hans Odén Evje and Anna Sofie Elle, finished his secondary education in 1922 and graduated as cand.jur. in 1926.

He served as State Conciliator of Norway from 1954 to 1964. From 1965 to 1970 he was appointed stipendiary magistrate of Oslo. His published works include (jointly with Paal Berg) Kommentar til Arbeidstvistloven and Tjenestetvistloven.

During the German occupation of Norway, Evje was incarcerated by the occupants, at Bredtvedt, Møllergata 19 and Grini, and sent to the Sachsenhausen concentration camp in July 1943.

After six years in Notodden Evje settled in Bærum in 1935 and represented the Labour Party in Bærum School Board from 1939 to 1954 and Bærum municipal council from 1946 to 1952. From 1946 to 1947 he also served as deputy mayor under Leif Larsen. Evje died in September 1976.

References

1902 births
1976 deaths 
Judges from Oslo
Sachsenhausen concentration camp survivors 
Labour Party (Norway) politicians
Bærum politicians